Krystyna Guzik ( Pałka; born 16 August 1983) is a Polish biathlete. She was born in Zakopane. She represented Poland at the 2006 Winter Olympics, 2010 Winter Olympics and 2014 Winter Olympics. Her best result at the Olympics was a tenth place in the 15 km individual event at the 2014 Games in Sochi. At the 2013 World Championships she won the silver medal in pursuit.

In July 2014, Guzik married fellow biathlete Grzegorz Guzik.

World Cup Podiums

Record

Olympic Games
0 medals

World Championships
1 medal (1 silver)

References

External links
Vancouver 2010
IBU Profile

1983 births
Living people
Sportspeople from Zakopane
Polish female biathletes
Olympic biathletes of Poland
Biathletes at the 2006 Winter Olympics
Biathletes at the 2010 Winter Olympics
Biathletes at the 2014 Winter Olympics
Biathletes at the 2018 Winter Olympics
Biathlon World Championships medalists
21st-century Polish women